The Nesoi were the goddesses of islands in ancient Greek religion.

NESOI may also refer to:

 NESOI (Not Elsewhere Specified or Indicated), used in categorizing cargo items

See also
 Nesi (disambiguation)
 NES (disambiguation)